Butterfly Fish is a 2015 novel by Nigerian writer Irenosen Okojie. It was published by Jacaranda Books.

Plot summary
The novel focuses on Joy, a Nigerian London-based photographer who lives with her mother. As the novel progresses, Joy's mother dies leaving her with the family inheritance which includes her grandfather's journal and a bronze from Benin Kingdom, she is tasked grieving for her dead mother and finding her family secrets.

References

2015 Nigerian novels
Novels about photographers